The 970s decade ran from January 1, 970, to December 31, 979.

Significant people
 Mar Abdisho I, Patriarch of the Assyrian Church of the East, held position 963–986
 Eric the Red (950–1003), Norse Explorer
 Richard I of Normandy (933–996), Duke of Normandy, r. 942–996
 Mieszko I of Poland (945?–992), Duke of Poland, r. c.960–992
 Vladimir of Kiev (958-1015), Kievan Prince and future Grand Prince of Kievan Rus
 Hisham II caliph of Córdoba
 Al-Aziz Billah Fatimid caliph of Cairo
 Al-Muti caliph of Baghdad
 At-Ta'i caliph of Baghdad

References